The Battle of Tianquan was a battle fought between the communists and the nationalists during the Chinese Civil War in the post World War II era and resulted in communist victory.  It is also called "The Battle to Defend Tianquan" (Tianquan Baoweizhan, 天全保卫战) by the communists.

Order of Battle
Nationalists (3,000+)
Southwestern (China) Anticommunist National Salvation Army
Local bandits
Communists (100+)
A company of the 555th Regiment

On February 14, 1950, Cheng Zhiwu (程志武) the nationalist commander of the Southwestern (China) National Revolutionary Army Region negotiated with local bandits headed by Li Yuanheng (李元亨) to ally with him in an assault on the town of Tianquan County (天全) in Xikang (Present day Sichuan). The Nationalist forces expected an easy victory as the town was guarded by a single communist company of the 555th Regiment. The Nationalist Revolutionary Army besieged the town on the same day, severing all communications. The garrison was eventually overwhelmed by the Nationalist forces.

On the February 15, 1950, over a hundred National Revolutionary Army successfully penetrated into the town via the Western Pass (Xi Guan, 西关) under cover of heavy fire. The Peoples Liberation Army managed to outflank and rout the attackers. This demoralized the National Revolutionary Army who were forced into a stalemate. However, the situation facing the Peoples Liberation Army defenders was one of short supply and low morale. The final assault which occurred on the February 20, 1950, with over a hundred National Revolutionary Army soldiers successfully taking over a bunker in the Tianquan.  The defending company of the 555th Regiment then counterattacked and besieged the bunker. The successful dynamiting of the bunker by the Peoples Liberation Army resulted in a military rout for the National Revolutionary Army. The Cheng Zhiwu was unable to stop his fleeing troops, forcing a complete withdraw. Given the opportunity, the Peoples Liberation Army counterattacked, inflicting further casualties on the National Revolutionary Army and taking over a hundred prisoners.

The National Revolutionary Army's failure was due to the reliance on poorly trained bandits. The bandits themselves were poorly organised and unwilling to fight. The few dedicated anticommunists under Cheng Zhiwu were not able to change the tide of the battle.

See also
List of battles of the Chinese Civil War
National Revolutionary Army
History of the People's Liberation Army
Chinese Civil War

References

Zhu, Zongzhen and Wang, Chaoguang, Liberation War History, 1st Edition, Social Scientific Literary Publishing House in Beijing, 2000,  (set)
Zhang, Ping, History of the Liberation War, 1st Edition, Chinese Youth Publishing House in Beijing, 1987,  (pbk.)
Jie, Lifu, Records of the Liberation War: The Decisive Battle of Two Kinds of Fates, 1st Edition, Hebei People's Publishing House in Shijiazhuang, 1990,  (set)
Literary and Historical Research Committee of the Anhui Committee of the Chinese People's Political Consultative Conference, Liberation War, 1st Edition, Anhui People's Publishing House in Hefei, 1987, 
Li, Zuomin, Heroic Division and Iron Horse: Records of the Liberation War, 1st Edition, Chinese Communist Party History Publishing House in Beijing, 2004, 
Wang, Xingsheng, and Zhang, Jingshan, Chinese Liberation War, 1st Edition, People's Liberation Army Literature and Art Publishing House in Beijing, 2001,  (set)
Huang, Youlan, History of the Chinese People's Liberation War, 1st Edition, Archives Publishing House in Beijing, 1992, 
Liu Wusheng, From Yan'an to Beijing: A Collection of Military Records and Research Publications of Important Campaigns in the Liberation War, 1st Edition, Central Literary Publishing House in Beijing, 1993, 
Tang, Yilu and Bi, Jianzhong, History of Chinese People's Liberation Army in Chinese Liberation War, 1st Edition, Military Scientific Publishing House in Beijing, 1993 – 1997,  (Volum 1), 7800219615 (Volum 2), 7800219631 (Volum 3), 7801370937 (Volum 4), and 7801370953 (Volum 5)

1950 in China
Battles of the Chinese Civil War
Conflicts in 1950
February 1950 events in Asia
Military history of Fujian